Manahen  (also Manaen or Menachem) was a teacher in the first century Christian Church at Antioch who had been 'brought up' (syntrophos, Vulgate: collactaneus) with Herod Antipas. 

According to the Acts of the Apostles, he was among those who sent Paul and Barnabas on their first missionary journey. He was probably one of the founders of the church at Antioch.

Biblical narrative
Little is known of Manahen's life. He is said to have been 'brought up' with Herod the tetrarch. Many biblical translations describe him as Herod's 'foster brother'  or as his 'life-long friend'. According to the Acts of the Apostles he was one of the prophets and teachers who, under the influence of the Holy Spirit, laid hands upon Saul and Barnabas and sent the two apostles on the first of Paul's missionary journeys. 

As Luke, the assumed author of the Acts of the Apostles, was an Antiochene, it is possible that Manahen was one of the "eyewitnesses and ministers of the word" who provided Luke details which that writer has in regard to Antipas and other members of the Herodian family (Luke 3:1, 19, 20; 8:3; 9:7-9; 13:31, 32; 23:8-12; Acts 12). He may have become a disciple of Jesus with "Joanna, the wife of Chusa, Herod's steward" (Luke 8:3).

Early historian references
In A.D. 39, Antipas left for Rome to gain the favor of Caligula, but instead received an order of perpetual exile. (Jos., "Ant.", XVIII, vii, 2). During this time, the Church of Antioch was founded by Jewish Christians, who "had been dispersed by the persecution that arose on the occasion of Stephen" and had taught the Gospel also to the Greeks of Antioch, (Acts 11:19-24). It is quite likely that St. Manahen was one of these founders of the Antiochene Church. The date of his death is unknown, but he is supposed to have died at Antioch in Syria.

Veneration
Manahen is mentioned in many of the ancient Martyrologies.

His feast day is celebrated on May 23 in the Eastern Orthodox Church and on May 24 in the Roman Catholic Church.

See also
List of names for the Biblical nameless
Saint Manahen, patron saint archive

References

Year of birth missing
Year of death missing
1st-century Christian saints
Early Jewish Christians
Prophets of the New Testament
Saints from Roman Syria